Adriana Johanna Jacoba Admiraal-Meijerink (13 June 1893 – 5 May 1992) was a Dutch fencer. She competed in the women's individual foil at the 1924 and 1928 Summer Olympics.

References

External links
 

1893 births
1992 deaths
Dutch female foil fencers
Olympic fencers of the Netherlands
Fencers at the 1924 Summer Olympics
Fencers at the 1928 Summer Olympics
Sportspeople from Haarlem